Tsona County or
Cona County is a county in Shannan prefecture in southern part of Tibet region of China. The county lies immediately to the north of the McMahon Line agreed as the mutual border between British India and Tibet in 1914. China has not accepted the 1914 border delineation, but treats it as the Line of Actual Control (LAC). The Tsona County also borders Bhutan on its southwest.

Geography 
Two main south-flowing rivers Nyamjang Chu and Tsona Chu flow through the county and enter India's Tawang district, where they join the Tawang Chu river. Between Nyamjang Chu and Tsona Chu lies an undulating plateau, with streams flowing west to east, often after collecting into lakes. Napa Yutso Lake and Nyapa Tso are two such large lakes.

In addition, the Tsona County also contains the basins of the east-flowing rivers that form the Subansiri River. Loro Karpo Chu (the "white Loro river") in the north leads to the Jorra township. Loro Nakpo Chu (the "black Loro river") leads to the Khartak (or Kardag) township..

Tsona Dzong, the main town and the headquarters of the Tsona County, is in the plateau between Nyamjang Chu and Tsona Chu. It is 34 km north of Bum La Pass, which marks the border with the Tawang district. Immediately to the north of Bum La is the village of Shao, whose full name Shauk Tago has been associated with Guru Padmasambhava and other Buddhist preachers over centuries. The location is mentioned in these texts as being part of "Monyul" i.e., Tawang area.

History 

Tsona Dzong is on the historical trade route between Tibet and the Assam region of India. The original route led via the Nyamjang Chu and Tawang Chu rivers via Trashigang to Dewangiri (then in Assam, but now in the Samdrup Jongkhar District of Bhutan).

17th century 
In the 17th century, sectarian rivalries developed between the Gelugpa sect that was in the ascendant in Central Tibet and the Drukpa sect that got consolidated in Bhutan. The Mera lama of the Merag-Sagteng region in present day Bhutan, belonging to the Gelugpa sect, was chased out of his native village by the Drukpa forces. He fled to the neighbouring Tawang region. The people of Tawang were apparently indifferent to the sectarian divisions, and the Mera lama requested help from the governor of Tsona. However, the Tsona forces were unable to resolve the conflict between the sects. Eventually a direct appeal to the Fifth Dalai Lama was made asking him to "annex" Tawang. According to Tawang records, an edict to this effect was issued in 1680,  establishing a new Gelugpa regime in Tawang. The Mera Lama was placed in a position of authority over the region and made responsible to Tsona. Since the traditional route via Trashigang was now lost to Bhutan, a new route was developed via Dirang and the area under the Sela Pass (present day West Kameng) was brought under Tawang's control.

The Fifth Dalai Lama died two years after these events, and his reincarnation was discovered to have been born in Tawang in 1683. The family of the young boy, the next  Dalai Lama, was secretly transported to Tsona, where he was raised under the watch of the Tsona dzongpöns. The family was taken to Nakartsé in 1697, after which the Desi (Regent) revealed the news of the Fifth Dalai Lama's death and his reincarnation to be installed as the Sixth Dalai Lama.

Administration
The Tsona County has 9 townships:

 Tsona/Cona (original name: Zholshar)
 Chudromo/Quchomo
 Kongri/Gongri
 Kyipa/Jiba
 Marmang/Mama
 Khachu/Kuju
 Lé
 Khartak/Kardag/Kada
 Jorra/Juela
 Lampug/Langpo
Kongri, Kyipa, Marmang, and Lé are in the Nyamjang Chu valley and are recognized as Monpa ethnic townships.

Climate

Maps

See also 
 Administrative divisions of China
 List of prefectures in China
 List of counties in China

Notes

References

Bibliography

External links
 Tsona County marked on OpenStreetMap
 Cona County Annals

Counties of Tibet
Shannan, Tibet
Territorial disputes of China
Territorial disputes of India